Phaeosoma nigricorne is a species of ulidiid or picture-winged fly in the genus Phaeosoma of the family Ulidiidae.

References

Ulidiidae